Brother vs. Brother may refer to:
 Twin Dragons, a 1992 Hong Kong action comedy film
 Brother Vs. Brother (TV series), a Canadian reality television series starring twins Jonathan and Drew Scott, known as Property Brothers

See also
 Brother against brother

Hong Kong action comedy films